Banta linnei is a butterfly of the family Hesperiidae. It is found in Papua on New Guinea.

The length of the forewings is about 18.5 mm.

External links
Notes on some skippers of the Taractrocera-group (Lepidoptera: Hesperiidae: Hesperiinae) from New Guinea

Hesperiinae
Butterflies described in 2008